P. elegantissima may refer to:
 Pedicularia elegantissima, a sea snail species
 Phaegoptera elegantissima, a synonym for Anaxita decorata, the decorated beauty, a moth species found in Mexico and Central America